Minsk (Ru:Минск), also known as M1NSK, is a Belarusian brand of motorcycles, scooters, ATVs and snowmobiles, produced by the Minsk Motorcycle and Bicycle Plant (MMVZ). The first M1A motorcycle was released in 1951. Since 2007, the company is a private enterprise. More than 6.5 million Minsk motorcycles have been sold worldwide.

M1NSK built bicycles are branded as Aist.

The beginning

After World War II the documentation and equipment of the German DKW factory in Zschopau were taken to the Soviet Union as war reparations. Production of the RT 125 model began in Moscow under the M1A brand. By the Order No.494 of the Ministry of automotive industry of the Soviet Union dated 12 July 1951 the production of M1A was transferred from Moscow to the Minsk Motorcycle and Bicycle Plant (MMVZ, then Motovelo). This model was imported into the United Kingdom by Neval Motorcycles, marketed as Neval.

MMVZ

The new models code name system was introduced in 1973 with the new Minsk MMVZ-3.111.

Reliability and simplicity made Minsk motorcycles a cult brand in Vietnam, which was the most extensive export market. Minsk motorcycles were among the Soviet motorcycles that were distributed by SATRA, UK, under the Minsk Saturn 125 and Cossack brand names from 1973 to 1979.

M1NSK

In 2007 Motovelo became a private company. Motorcycles sold under M1NSK brand are rebadged Chinese products. For example, M1nsk TRX 300i is a Zongshen RX3.

Key models

 1951: Minsk М1А
 1956: Minsk М1М
 1973: Minsk MMVZ-3.111
 1994: Minsk MMVZ-3.113
 2010: M1NSK R
 2013: M1NSK TRX

Models

Mopeds

 MMVZ-1.101 (1995-1998).
 MMVZ-1.102 (2003-2004).
 MMVZ-2.154 (2006-2010).
 M1NSK D 49

Scooters

 M1NSK TC 49
 M1NSK TM 49
 M1NSK TX 49

Electric scooters

 M1NSK Upa-Upa 500E

Road bikes

 Minsk M1A "Moscow" (1951)
 Minsk M1M (1956-1961).
 Minsk M-103 (1962-1964 biennium).
 Minsk M-104 (1964-1967 biennium).
 Minsk M-105 (1967-1971 biennium).
 Minsk M-106 (1971-1973 biennium).
 MMVZ-3.111 (1973-1976).
 MMVZ-3.115 (1976-1980).
 MMVZ-3.112 (1982-1995).
 MMVZ-3.113 (C 125)
 MMVZ-3.114 (C4 125)
 MMVZ-3.119 (M 125, F 125H)
 M1NSK C4 200
 M1NSK C4 250
 M1NSK R 250
 M1NSK CX 200
 M1NSK D4 125

Enduro

 M1NSK X 200
 M1NSK ERX 250
 M1NSK TRX 300i
 KTNS RS3 (Malaysia Market)

Quads

 M1NSK KD 500
 M1NSK KD 625
 M1NSK KD 625B
 M1NSK KD 500U

Snowmobiles

M1NSK NIX 390

Racing motorcycles

 Minsk M-201K (1956)
 Minsk M-201M (1956) - a multi-day event.
 Minsk SHK-125 (1961) - The road-racing circuit.
 Minsk M-205 - highway-ring races.
 Minsk M-213 (1969) - The multi-day event.
 Minsk M-211 (1971 YG)
 MMVZ-3.221 "Cross" - motocross.
 MMVZ-3.216 (1977)
 MMVZ-3.225 (1980) - motocross.
 MMVZ-3.227 (1987-1991.) - Highway-ring races.
 MMVZ-3.229
 MMVZ-3.232 (5.232) (1993) - trial.
 RX 250 - motocross.
 M1NSK RX 450 - motocross.

See also

 Ural
 Dnipro
 Voskhod
 IZh

References

External links
Minsk Moto Homepage
Minsk Bike Models

Companies based in Minsk
Economy of Minsk
Motorcycle manufacturers of the Soviet Union
Motorcycle manufacturers of Belarus
Science and technology in Belarus
Soviet brands
Belarusian brands